Lieutenant-Colonel Andrew Clarke KCH (1793 – 11 February 1847) was Governor of Western Australia from 1846 until his death in 1847.

Andrew Clarke was born in Donegal, Ireland in 1793. He entered the British Army as an ensign in the 8th West India Regiment (without purchase) at the age of 13 in 1806, and rose rapidly through the ranks. In 1808 he transferred to the 46th Foot as lieutenant, again without purchase. At the age of 18, he was given temporary command of the troops in Van Diemen's Land. In 1813 he became a captain and went to New South Wales with his regiment. In 1818 he was in India, and in 1823 he married a widow named Frances Lardner, while on leave in England. A son was born in July 1824. In 1825 he purchased a majority. He returned to Europe in 1833, was created a knight of the Royal Hanoverian Guelphic Order in 1837, was promoted to lieutenant-colonel in the Army in 1838, and purchased the lieutenant-colonelcy of his regiment in 1839. In 1842 Colonel Clarke took his regiment to the West Indies and was appointed Lieutenant-Governor of St. Lucia, which he left in 1844. In the following year he exchanged into the 41st Foot and was appointed Governor of Western Australia, where he arrived on 26 January 1846. He became ill not long afterwards and died on 11 February 1847.

Andrew's Clarke's son, also named Andrew Clarke, held a number of important public positions for the colony of Victoria, and was for a time a Member of its Legislative Assembly. For six years, he was the governor of the Straits Settlements in Malaya. His stepdaughter, Fanny Jackson, married George Fletcher Moore. Amongst his nephews was the Australian novelist and poet Marcus Clarke.

References 

  (This reference is primarily about Clarke's son, but provides substantial information on Clarke himself)
 

1793 births
1847 deaths
Politicians from County Donegal
West India Regiment officers
46th Regiment of Foot officers
41st Regiment of Foot officers
Governors of Western Australia
Burials at East Perth Cemeteries
Irish emigrants to colonial Australia
Colony of Western Australia people
Governors of British Saint Lucia